The 2023 season is the 109th season in the existence of Ceará Sporting Club and the club's first season back in the Série B since 2016, following its relegation from the Série A last season. In addition to the Série B, Ceará are also participating in this season's editions of the Copa do Brasil, Copa do Nordeste and Campeonato Cearense.

On 9 February, the resignation of president Robinson de Castro was announced. The then second vice president, Carlos Moraes, temporarily assumes the executive presidency of the club. On the same day, José Barreto de Carvalho Filho was elected president of the club's deliberative council until 2026.

Players

First-team squad

Academy

Out on loan

Transfers 
Source:ge and others

In

Loans return

Out

Pre-season training game

Campeonato Cearense

First stage

Copa do Nordeste

Group stage

Copa do Brasil

Preliminary stages

Série B

Statistics

Appearances and goals
Numbers after plus-sign (+) denote appearances as a substitute.

|-
! colspan=16 style=background:#dcdcdc; text-align:center|Goalkeepers

|-
! colspan=16 style=background:#dcdcdc; text-align:center|Defenders

|-
! colspan=16 style=background:#dcdcdc; text-align:center|Midfielders

|-
! colspan=16 style=background:#dcdcdc; text-align:center|Forwards

|-
! colspan=16 style=background:#dcdcdc; text-align:center|Players who played in the season but left the club:

|}

Notes

References

External links 

Ceará